Ḥadīth ( or ; , , ,  , , , , literally "talk" or "discourse") or Athar (literally "remnant"/"effect") refers to what most  Muslims and the mainstream schools of Islamic thought, believe to be a record of the words, actions, and the silent approval of the Islamic prophet Muhammad as transmitted through chains of narrators. In other words, the ḥadīth are transmitted reports attributed to what Muhammad said and did. 

Hadith have been called by some as "the backbone" of Islamic civilization, and for many the authority of hadith as a source for religious law and moral guidance ranks second only to that of the Quran (which Muslims hold to be the word of God revealed to Muhammad). Most Muslims believe that scriptural authority for hadith comes from the Quran, which enjoins Muslims to emulate Muhammad and obey his judgements (in verses such as).

Thus for many, the "great bulk" of the rules of Sharia (Islamic law) are derived from hadith, rather than the Quran. 

 is the Arabic word for things like speech, report, account, narrative. Unlike the Quran, not all Muslims believe that hadith accounts (or at least not all hadith accounts) are divine revelation. Different collections of hadīth would come to differentiate the different branches of the Islamic faith. Some Muslims believe that Islamic guidance should be based on the Quran only, thus rejecting the authority of hadith; some further claim that most hadiths are fabrications (pseudepigrapha) created in the 8th and 9th centuries AD, and which are falsely attributed to Muhammad.

Because some hadith contain questionable and even contradictory statements, the authentication of hadith became a major field of study in Islam. In its classic form a hadith consists of two parts—the chain of narrators who have transmitted the report (the ), and the main text of the report (the ). However, different groups and different scholars may classify a hadith differently.

Among scholars of Sunni Islam the term hadith may include not only the words, advice, practices, etc. of Muhammad, but also those of his companions.

Etymology

In Arabic, the noun  (  ) means "report", "account", or "narrative". Hadith also refers to the speech of a person.

Definition
In Islamic terminology, according to Juan Campo, the term hadith refers to reports of statements or actions of Muhammad, or of his tacit approval or criticism of something said or done in his presence.

Classical hadith specialist Ibn Hajar al-Asqalani says that the intended meaning of hadith in religious tradition is something attributed to Muhammad but that is not found in the Quran.

Scholar Patricia Crone includes reports by others than Muhammad in her definition of hadith: "short reports (sometimes just a line or two) recording what an early figure, such as a companion of the prophet or Muhammad himself, said or did on a particular occasion, preceded by a chain of transmitters". However, she adds that "nowadays, hadith almost always means hadith from Muhammad himself."

In contrast, according to the Shia Islam Ahlul Bayt Digital Library Project, "... when there is no clear Qur'anic statement, nor is there a Hadith upon which Muslim schools have agreed. ... Shi'a ... refer to Ahlul-Bayt  [the family of Muhammad] to derive the Sunnah of the Prophet"—implying that while hadith is limited to the "Traditions" of Muhammad, the Shi'a Sunna draws on the sayings, etc. of the  i.e. the Imams of Shi'a Islam.

Distinction from 
The word  is also used in reference to a normative custom of Muhammad or the early Muslim community.

Another source (Joseph A. Islam) distinguishes between the two saying: 
Whereas the 'Hadith' is an oral communication that is allegedly derived from the Prophet or his teachings, the 'Sunna' (quite literally: mode of life, behaviour or example) signifies the prevailing customs of a particular community or people.  ... A 'Sunna' is a practice which has been passed on by a community from generation to generation en masse, whereas the hadith are reports collected by later compilers often centuries removed from the source. ... A practice which is contained within the Hadith may well be regarded as Sunna, but it is not necessary that a Sunna would have a supporting hadith sanctioning it.

Distinction from other literature

They differ from hadith in that they are organized "relatively chronologically" rather than by subject. 
 (literally "way of going" or "conduct"), biographies of Muhammad, written since the middle of the eighth century. Similar writings called  (literally "raid") preceded the  literature, focusing on military actions of Muhammad, but also included non-military aspects of his life.  Therefore, there is overlap in the meaning of the terms, although  suggests military aspects rather than general biographical ones.
Other "traditions" of Islam related to hadith include: 
 (literally news, information, pl. ) may be used as a synonym for hadith, but some scholars use it to refer to traditions about Muhammad's companions and their successors from the following generation, in contrast to hadith as defined as traditions about Muhammad himself. Another definition (by Ibn Warraq) describes them as "discrete anecdotes or reports" from early Islam which "include simple statements, utterances of authoritative scholars, saints, or statesmen, reports of events, and stories about historical events all varying in length from one line to several pages." 
Conversely,  (trace, remnant) usually refers to traditions about the companions and successors, though sometimes connotes traditions about Muhammad.

Hadith compilation
The hadith literature in use today is based on spoken reports in circulation after the death of Muhammad. Unlike the Quran, hadith were not promptly written down during Muhammad's lifetime or immediately after his death. Hadith were evaluated orally to written and gathered into large collections during the 8th and 9th centuries, generations after Muhammad's death, after the end of the era of the Rashidun Caliphate, over 1,000 km (600 mi) from where Muhammad lived.

"Many thousands of times" more numerous than the verses of the Quran, hadith have been described as resembling layers surrounding the "core" of Islamic beliefs (the Quran). Well-known, widely accepted hadith make up the narrow inner layer, with a hadith becoming less reliable and accepted with each layer stretching outward.

The reports of Muhammad's (and sometimes his companions') behavior collected by hadith compilers include details of ritual religious practice such as the five  (obligatory Islamic prayers) that are not found in the Quran, as well as everyday behavior such as table manners, dress, and posture.

Some important elements, which are today taken to be a long-held part of Islamic practice and belief are not mentioned in the Quran, but are reported in hadiths. Therefore, Muslims usually maintain that hadiths are a necessary requirement for the true and proper practice of Islam, as it gives Muslims the nuanced details of Islamic practice and belief in areas where the Quran is silent. An example is the obligatory prayers, which are commanded in the Quran, but explained in hadith.

Details of the prescribed movements and words of the prayer (known as ) and how many times they are to be performed, are found in hadith. However, hadiths differ on these details and consequently  is performed differently by different hadithist Islamic sects. Quranists, on the other hand, believe that if the Quran is silent on some matter, it is because God did not hold its detail to be of consequence; and that some hadith contradict the Quran, proving that some hadith are a source of corruption and not a complement to the Quran.

Non-prophetic hadith

Joseph Schacht quotes a hadith of Muhammad that is used "to justify reference" in Islamic law to the companions of Muhammad as religious authorities—"My companions are like lodestars."  

"...from other persons are of no account in the face of a tradition from the Prophet, whether they confirm or contradict it; if the other persons had been aware of the tradition from the Prophet, they would have followed it".

This led to "the almost complete neglect" of traditions from the Companions and others.

Collections of hadith sometimes mix those of Muhammad with the reports of others. Muwatta Imam Malik is usually described as "the earliest written collection of hadith" but sayings of Muhammad are "blended with the sayings of the companions", (822 hadith from Muhammad and 898 from others, according to the count of one edition).
However, the acts, statements or approvals of the Prophet Muhammad are called , while those of companions are called   , and those of Tabi'un are called   .

Impact, typology and components

Impact
The hadith had a profound and controversial influence on tafsir (commentaries of the Quran). The earliest commentary of the Quran known as Tafsir Ibn Abbas is sometimes attributed to the companion Ibn Abbas.

The hadith were used the form the basis of sharia (the religious law system forming part of the Islamic tradition), and fiqh (Islamic jurisprudence). The hadith are at the root of why there is no single fiqh system, but rather a collection of parallel systems within Islam.

Much of the early Islamic history available today is also based on the hadith, although it has been challenged for its lack of basis in primary source material and the internal contradictions of available secondary material.

Types
 Hadith may be hadith qudsi (sacred hadith) — which some Muslims regard as the words of God — or hadith sharif (noble hadith), which are Muhammad's own utterances.

According to as-Sayyid ash-Sharif al-Jurjani, the hadith qudsi differ from the Quran in that the former are "expressed in Muhammad's words", whereas the latter are the "direct words of God". A hadith qudsi need not be a sahih (sound hadith), but may be da‘if or even mawdu‘.

An example of a hadith qudsi is the hadith of Abu Hurairah who said that Muhammad said:
When God decreed the Creation He pledged Himself by writing in His book which is laid down with Him: My mercy prevails over My wrath.

In the Shia school of thought, there are two fundamental viewpoints of hadith: The Usuli view and the Akhbari view. The Usuli scholars emphasize the importance of scientific examination of hadiths through ijtihad while the Akhbari scholars consider all hadiths from the four Shia books as authentic
.

Components
The two major aspects of a hadith are the text of the report (the matn), which contains the actual narrative, and the chain of narrators (the isnad), which documents the route by which the report has been transmitted. The isnad was an effort to document that a hadith actually came from Muhammad, and Muslim scholars from the eighth century to the present have never ceased to repeat the mantra "The isnad is part of the religion — if not for the isnad, whoever wanted could say whatever they wanted." The isnad literally means "support", and it is so named because hadith specialists rely on it to determine the authenticity or weakness of a hadith. The isnad consists of a chronological list of the narrators, each mentioning the one from whom they heard the hadith, until mentioning the originator of the matn along with the matn itself.

The first people to hear hadith were the companions who preserved it and then conveyed it to those after them. Then the generation following them received it, thus conveying it to those after them and so on. So a companion would say, "I heard the Prophet say such and such." The Follower would then say, "I heard a companion say, 'I heard the Prophet.'" The one after him would then say, "I heard someone say, 'I heard a Companion say, 'I heard the Prophet...''" and so on.

Hadith literature by branch or denomination of Islam

Different branches of Islam refer to different collections of hadith, although the same incident may be found in hadith from different collections. In general, the difference between Shi'a and Sunni collections is that Shia give preference to hadiths attributed to Muhammad's family and close companions (Ahl al-Bayt), while Sunnis do not consider family lineage in evaluating hadith and sunnah narrated by any of twelve thousand companions of Muhammad.

Sunni
In the Sunni branch of Islam, the canonical hadith collections are the six books, of which Sahih al-Bukhari and Sahih Muslim generally have the highest status. The other books of hadith are Sunan Abu Dawood, Jami' al-Tirmidhi, Al-Sunan al-Sughra and Sunan ibn Majah. However the Malikis, one of the four Sunni "schools of thought" (madhhabs), traditionally reject Sunan ibn Majah and assert the canonical status of Muwatta Imam Malik.

Shia
In the Twelver Shi'a branch of Islam, the canonical hadith collections are the Four Books: Kitab al-Kafi, Man la yahduruhu al-Faqih, Tahdhib al-Ahkam, and Al-Istibsar. 
The Ismaili shia sects use the Daim al-Islam as their hadith collections.

Ibadi
In the Ibadi branch of Islam, the main canonical collection is the Tartib al-Musnad. This is an expansion of the earlier Jami Sahih collection, which retains canonical status in its own right.

Others

The Ahmadiyya sect generally follows the Sunni canon.
Some minor groups, collectively known as Quranists, reject the authority of the hadith collections altogether.

History, tradition and usage

History

Traditions of the life of Muhammad and the early history of Islam were passed down mostly orally for more than a hundred years after Muhammad's death in AD 632. Muslim historians say that Caliph Uthman ibn Affan (the third khalifa (caliph) of the Rashidun Caliphate, or third successor of Muhammad, who had formerly been Muhammad's secretary), is generally credited with urging Muslims to record the hadith just as Muhammad had suggested that some of his followers to write down his words and actions.

Uthman's labours were cut short by his assassination, at the hands of aggrieved soldiers, in 656. No direct sources survive directly from this period so we are dependent on what later writers tell us about this period.

According to British historian of Arab world Alfred Guillaume, it is "certain" that "several small collections" of hadith were "assembled in Umayyad times."

In Islamic law, the use of hadith as it is understood today (hadith of Muhammad with documentation, isnads, etc.) came gradually. According to scholars such as Joseph Schacht, Ignaz Goldziher, and Daniel W. Brown, early schools of Islamic jurisprudence  used the rulings of the Prophet's Companions, the rulings of the Caliphs, and practices that “had gained general acceptance among the jurists of that school”. On his deathbed,  Caliph Umar instructed Muslims to seek guidance from the Quran, the early Muslims (muhajirun) who emigrated to Medina with Muhammad, the Medina residents who welcomed and supported the muhajirun (the ansar) and the people of the desert.

According to the scholars Harald Motzki and Daniel W. Brown the earliest Islamic legal reasonings that have come down to us were "virtually hadith-free", but gradually, over the course of second century A.H. "the infiltration and incorporation of Prophetic hadiths into Islamic jurisprudence" took place.

It was Abū ʿAbdullāh Muhammad ibn Idrīs al-Shāfiʿī (150-204 AH), known as al-Shafi'i, who emphasized the final authority of a hadith of Muhammad, so that even the Quran was "to be interpreted in the light of traditions (i.e. hadith), and not vice versa."  While traditionally the Qur'an has traditionally been considered superior in authority to the sunna, Al-Shafi'i "forcefully argued"  that the sunna was "on equal footing with the Quran", (according to scholar Daniel Brown) for (as Al-Shafi'i put it) “the command of the Prophet is the command of God.”

In 851 the rationalist Mu`tazila school of thought fell out of favor in the Abbasid Caliphate. The Mu`tazila, for whom the "judge of truth ... was human reason," had clashed with traditionists who looked to the literal meaning of the Quran and hadith for truth. While the Quran had been officially compiled and approved, hadiths had not.
One result was the number of hadiths began "multiplying in suspiciously direct correlation to their utility" to the quoter of the hadith  (Traditionists quoted hadith warning against listening to human opinion instead of Sharia; Hanafites quoted a hadith stating that "In my community there will rise a man called Abu Hanifa [the Hanafite founder] who will be its guiding light". In fact one agreed upon hadith warned that, "There will be forgers, liars who will bring you hadiths which neither you nor your forefathers have heard, Beware of them." In addition the number of hadith grew enormously. While Malik ibn Anas had attributed just 1720 statements or deeds to the Muhammad, it was no longer unusual to find people who had collected a hundred times that number of hadith.

Faced with a huge corpus of miscellaneous traditions supporting different views on a wide variety of controversial matters—some of them flatly contradicting each other—Islamic scholars of the Abbasid period sought to authenticate hadith.  Scholars had to decide which hadith were to be trusted as authentic and which had been fabricated for political or theological purposes. To do this, they used a number of techniques which Muslims now call the science of hadith.

The earliest surviving hadith manuscripts were copied on papyrus. A long scroll collects traditions trasmitted by the scholar and qadi 'Abd Allāh ibn Lahīʻa (d. 790). A Ḥadīth Dāwūd (History of David), attributed to Wahb ibn Munabbih, survives in a manuscript dated 844. A collection of hadiths dedicated to invocations to God, attributed to a certain Khālid ibn Yazīd, is dated 880-881. A consistent fragment of the Jāmiʿ of the Egyptian Maliki jurist 'Abd Allāh ibn Wahb (d. 813) is finally dated to 889.

Shia and Sunni textual traditions

Sunni and Shia hadith collections differ because scholars from the two traditions differ as to the reliability of the narrators and transmitters. Narrators who sided with Abu Bakr and Umar rather than Ali, in the disputes over leadership that followed the death of Muhammad, are considered unreliable by the Shia; narrations attributed to Ali and the family of Muhammad, and to their supporters, are preferred. Sunni scholars put trust in narrators such as Aisha, whom Shia reject. Differences in hadith collections have contributed to differences in worship practices and shari'a law and have hardened the dividing line between the two traditions.

Extent and nature in the Sunni tradition
In the Sunni tradition, the number of such texts is somewhere between seven and thirteen thousand, but the number of hadiths is far greater because several isnad sharing the same text are each counted as individual hadith. If,  say, ten companions record a text reporting a single incident in the life of Muhammad, hadith scholars can count this as ten hadiths. Thus, Musnad Ahmad, for example, has over 30,000 hadiths—but this count includes texts that are repeated in order to record slight variations within the text or within the chains of narrations. Identifying the narrators of the various texts, comparing their narrations of the same texts to identify both the soundest reporting of a text and the reporters who are most sound in their reporting occupied experts of hadith throughout the 2nd century. In the 3rd century of Islam (from 225/840 to about 275/889), hadith experts composed brief works recording a selection of about two- to five-thousand such texts which they felt to have been most soundly documented or most widely referred to in the Muslim scholarly community. The 4th and 5th century saw these six works being commented on quite widely. This auxiliary literature has contributed to making their study the place of departure for any serious study of hadith. In addition, Bukhari and Muslim in particular, claimed that they were collecting only the soundest of sound hadiths. These later scholars tested their claims and agreed to them, so that today, they are considered the most reliable collections of hadith. Toward the end of the 5th century, Ibn al-Qaisarani formally standardized the Sunni canon into six pivotal works, a delineation which remains to this day.

Over the centuries, several different categories of collections have emerged. Some are more general, such as the muṣannaf, the muʿjam, and the jāmiʿ, and some more specific, characterized either by the subjects covered, such as the sunan (restricted to legal-liturgical traditions), or bytheirs composition, such as the arbaʿīniyyāt (collections of forty hadiths).

Extent and nature in the Shia tradition
Shi'a Muslims seldom if ever use the six major hadith collections followed by the Sunnis because they do not trust many of the Sunni narrators and transmitters. They have their own extensive hadith literature. The best-known hadith collections are The Four Books, which were compiled by three authors who are known as the 'Three Muhammads'. The Four Books are: Kitab al-Kafi by Muhammad ibn Ya'qub al-Kulayni al-Razi (329 AH), Man la yahduruhu al-Faqih by Muhammad ibn Babuya and Al-Tahdhib and Al-Istibsar both by Shaykh Muhammad Tusi. Shi'a clerics also make use of extensive collections and commentaries by later authors.

Unlike Sunnis, the majority of Shia do not consider any of their hadith collections to be sahih (authentic) in their entirety. Therefore, each individual hadith in a specific collection must be investigated separately to determine its authenticity. The Akhbari school, however, considers all the
 hadith from the four books to be authentic.

The importance of hadith in the Shia school of thought is well documented. This can be captured by Ali ibn Abi Talib, cousin of Muhammad, when he narrated that "Whoever of our Shia (followers) knows our Shariah and takes out the weak of our followers from the darkness of ignorance to the light of knowledge (Hadith) which we (Ahl al-Bayt) have gifted to them, he on the day of judgement will come with a crown on his head. It will shine among the people gathered on the plain of resurrection." Hassan al-Askari, a descendant of Muhammad, gave support to this narration, stating "Whoever he had taken out in the worldly life from the darkness of ignorance can hold to his light to be taken out of the darkness of the plain of resurrection to the garden (paradise). Then all those whomever he had taught in the worldly life anything of goodness, or had opened from his heart a lock of ignorance or had removed his doubts will come out."

Regarding the importance of maintaining accuracy in recording hadith, it has been documented that Muhammad al-Baqir, the great grandson of Muhammad, has said that "Holding back in a doubtful issue is better than entering destruction. Your not narrating a Hadith is better than you narrating a Hadith in which you have not studied thoroughly. On every truth, there is a reality. Above every right thing, there is a light. Whatever agrees with the book of Allah you must take it and whatever disagrees you must leave it alone." Al-Baqir also emphasized the selfless devotion of Ahl al-Bayt to preserving the traditions of Muhammad through his conversation with Jabir ibn Abd Allah, an old companion of Muhammad. He (Al-Baqir) said, "Oh Jabir, had we spoken to you from our opinions and desires, we would be counted among those who are destroyed. We speak to you of the hadith which we treasure from the Messenger of Allah, Oh Allah grant compensation to Muhammad and his family worthy of their services to your cause, just as they treasure their gold and silver." Further, it has been narrated that Ja'far al-Sadiq, the son of al-Baqir, has said the following regarding hadith: "You must write it down; you will not memorize until you write it down."

Modern usage

Hadith as an Interpretation of the Holy Quran:
 

The mainstream sects consider hadith to be essential supplements to, and clarifications of, the Quran, Islam's holy book, as well as for clarifying issues pertaining to Islamic jurisprudence. Ibn al-Salah, a hadith specialist, described the relationship between hadith and other aspects of the religion by saying: "It is the science most pervasive in respect to the other sciences in their various branches, in particular to jurisprudence being the most important of them." "The intended meaning of 'other sciences' here are those pertaining to religion," explains Ibn Hajar al-Asqalani, "Quranic exegesis, hadith, and jurisprudence. The science of hadith became the most pervasive due to the need displayed by each of these three sciences. The need hadith has of its science is apparent. As for Quranic exegesis, then the preferred manner of explaining the speech of God is by means of what has been accepted as a statement of Muhammad. The one looking to this is in need of distinguishing the acceptable from the unacceptable. Regarding jurisprudence, then the jurist is in need of citing as an evidence the acceptable to the exception of the later, something only possible utilizing the science of hadith."

Studies and authentication

Authenticity of a hadith is primarily verified by its chain of transmission (isnad). Because a chain of transmission can be a forgery, the status of authenticity given by Muslim scholars, is not accepted by Orientalists or historians. Ignaz Goldziherr demonstrated that several hadiths do not fit the time of Muhammad chronologically and content-wise. As a result, many Orientalists regarded hadiths generally to be constructs of a later period of time, temporarily. This overly critical attitude is not the norm today. Comparing and analyzing different hadiths shows that many hadiths must have been written as early as the 7th century. Which hadith are authentic and which are not cannot be determined. According to Bernard Lewis, "in the early Islamic centuries there could be no better way of promoting a cause, an opinion, or a faction than to cite an appropriate action or utterance of the Prophet." To fight these forgeries, the elaborate science of hadith studies was devised to authenticate hadith known as ilm al jarh or ilm al dirayah 
 
Hadith studies use a number of methods of evaluation developed by early Muslim scholars in determining the veracity of reports attributed to Muhammad. This is achieved by: 
the individual narrators involved in its transmission, 
the scale of the report's transmission, 
analyzing the text of the report, and 
the routes through which the report was transmitted.

Based on these criteria, various classifications of hadith have been developed. The earliest comprehensive work in hadith studies was Abu Muhammad al-Ramahurmuzi's al-Muhaddith al-Fasil, while another significant work was al-Hakim al-Naysaburi's Ma‘rifat ‘ulum al-hadith. Ibn al-Salah's ʻUlum al-hadith is considered the standard classical reference on hadith studies. Some schools of Hadith methodology apply as many as sixteen separate tests.

Biographical evaluation

Biographical analysis (‘ilm al-rijāl, lit. "science of people", also "science of Asma Al-Rijal or ‘ilm al-jarḥ wa al-taʻdīl ("science of discrediting and accrediting"), in which details about the transmitter are scrutinized. This includes analyzing their date and place of birth; familial connections; teachers and students; religiosity; moral behaviour; literary output; their travels; as well as their date of death. Based upon these criteria, the reliability (thiqāt) of the transmitter is assessed. It is also determined whether the individual was actually able to transmit the report, which is deduced from their contemporaneity and geographical proximity with the other transmitters in the chain. Examples of biographical dictionaries include: Abd al-Ghani al-Maqdisi's Al-Kamal fi Asma' al-Rijal, Ibn Hajar al-Asqalani's Tahdhīb al-Tahdhīb and al-Dhahabi's Tadhkirat al-huffaz.

Scale of transmission
Hadith on matters of importance needed to come through a number of independent chains, this was known as the scale of transmission. Reports that passed through many reliable transmitters in many isnad up until their collection and transcription are known as mutawātir. These reports are considered the most authoritative as they pass through so many different routes that collusion between all of the transmitters becomes an impossibility. Reports not meeting this standard are known as aahad, and are of several different types.

Analyzing text
According to Muhammad Shafi, Hadith whose isnad has been scrutinized then have their text or matn examined for:
contradiction of the Quran;
contradiction of reliable hadith;
making sense, being logical;
being a report about the importance of an individual (or individuals) which is transmitted only through their supporters or family, and which is not supported by reports from other independent channels.

However, Joseph Schacht states that the "whole technical criticism of traditions ... is mainly based on criticism of isnads", which he (and others) believe to be ineffective in eliminating fraudulent hadith.

Terminology: admissible and inadmissible hadiths

Having been evaluated, hadith may be categorized. Two categories are: 
ṣaḥīḥ (sound, authentic), 
ḍaʿīf (weak)
Other classifications include: 
ḥasan (good), which refers to an otherwise ṣaḥīḥ report suffering from minor deficiency, or a weak report strengthened due to numerous other corroborating reports; 
mawḍūʿ (fabricated), 
munkar (denounced) which is a report that is rejected due to the presence of an unreliable transmitter contradicting another more reliable narrator. 
Both sahīh and hasan reports are considered acceptable for usage in Islamic legal discourse.

Criticism
Critics have complained that, contrary to the description above where the matn is scrutinized, the process of authenticating hadith "was confined to a careful examination of the chain of transmitters who narrated the report and not report itself. 'Provided the chain was uninterrupted and its individual links deemed trustworthy persons, the Hadith was accepted as binding law. There could, by the terms of the religious faith itself, be no questioning of the content of the report; for this was the substance of divine revelation and therefore not susceptible to any form of legal or historical criticism,'" according to scholar N.J. Coulson.

Criticism

The major points of intra-Muslim criticism of the hadith literature is based in questions regarding its authenticity. However, Muslim criticism of hadith is also based on theological and philosophical Islamic grounds of argument and critique.

With regard to clarity, Imam Ali al-Ridha has narrated that "In our Hadith there are Mutashabih (unclear ones) like those in al-Quran as well as Muhkam (clear ones) like those of al-Quran. You must refer the unclear ones to the clear ones."

Muslim scholars have a long history of questioning the hadith literature throughout Islamic history. Western academics also became active in the field later, starting in 1890, but much more often since 1950.

Some Muslim critics of hadith even go so far as to completely reject them as the basic texts of Islam and instead adhere to the movement called Quranism. Quranists argue that the Quran itself does not contain an invitation to accept hadith as a second theological source alongside the Quran. The expression "to obey God and the Messenger", which occurs among others in 3:132 or 4:69, is understood to mean that one follows the Messenger whose task it was to convey the Quran by following the Quran alone. Muhammad is, so to speak, a mediator from God to people through the Quran alone and not through hadith, according to Quranists.

Among the most prominent Muslim critics of hadith today are the Egyptian Rashad Khalifa, who became known as the "discoverer" of the Quran code (Code 19), the Malaysian Kassim Ahmad and the American-Turkish Edip Yüksel (Quranism).

See also

 Categories of Hadith
 Criticism of hadith
 Hadith studies
 Hadith terminology
 Islamic honorifics
 Kutub al-Sittah
 List of fatwas
 List of hadith authors and commentators
 List of hadith collections
 Oral Torah
 Prophetic biography
 Sacred tradition
 Sharia
 Tafsir

References

Notes

Citations

Bibliography
 
 
 
 
 
 

</ref>
 
 
 
 
 Schacht, Joseph (1950). The Origins of Muhammadan Jurisprudence. Oxford: Clarendon

Further reading

 Encyclopedia of Sahih Al-Bukhari by Arabic Virtual Translation Center (New York 2019, Barnes & Noble )
 English Translation of over 60,000 Basic Ahadith Books from Ahl Al-Bayt, Online Shia Islamic Articles, Books, Khutbat, Calendar, Duas ( including Bihar ul Anwaar})
 1000 Qudsi Hadiths: An Encyclopedia of Divine Sayings; New York: Arabic Virtual Translation Center; (2012) 
 
 
 Musa, A. Y. Hadith as Scripture: Discussions on The Authority Of Prophetic Traditions in Islam, New York: Palgrave, 2008. 
 Fred M. Donner, Narratives of Islamic Origins (1998)
 Tottoli, Roberto, "Hadith", in Muhammad in History, Thought, and Culture: An Encyclopedia of the Prophet of God (2 vols.), Edited by C. Fitzpatrick and A. Walker, Santa Barbara, ABC-CLIO, 2014, Vol I, pp. 231–236.

Online 
 Hadith Islam, in Encyclopædia Britannica Online, by Albert Kenneth Cragg, Gloria Lotha, Marco Sampaolo, Matt Stefon, Noah Tesch and Adam Zeidan
Hadith by Topics and advice of PBUH

External links

 Hadith – Search by keyword and find hadith by narrator
 
 

 
Islamic terminology
Islamic theology
Muhammad